Lea Bouard (born 7 June 1996) is a German freestyle skier. She competed in the 2018 Winter Olympics in the moguls event.

In June 2016 she switched nationality and began competing for Germany. She represented France at 2015 and 2016 Junior World Ski Championships, winning 2 bronze and a silver medal.

Personal
She was born in Germany to a German mother and a French father.

References

1996 births
Living people
Freestyle skiers at the 2018 Winter Olympics
German female freestyle skiers
Olympic freestyle skiers of Germany
German people of French descent
People from Weinheim
Sportspeople from Karlsruhe (region)
Université Savoie-Mont Blanc alumni
Universiade gold medalists for Germany
Universiade silver medalists for Germany
Universiade medalists in freestyle skiing
Competitors at the 2019 Winter Universiade
21st-century German women